Bobi Ladawa Mobutu (born 2 September 1945) is the second wife and widow of Mobutu Sese Seko, who ruled Zaire (now the Democratic Republic of the Congo) as president between 1965 and 1997.

She was born at Dula in the western province of Équateur and attended a Roman Catholic convent school in the capital Kinshasa before embarking on a teaching career. In the 1970s, she became the mistress of President Mobutu. She bore his children before his first wife, Marie-Antoinette, died in 1977. She married Mobutu in both church and civil ceremonies on 1 May 1980, on the eve of a visit by Pope John Paul II. The pope refused Mobutu's request to officiate over the ceremony.

The couple had a total of four children — three sons, Gyala, Ndokula, and Nzanga, and a daughter, Toku. Bobi Ladawa, who was customarily addressed as "Citizen Bobi" or "Mama Bobi", frequently accompanied her husband abroad. She promoted issues such as health, education and women's rights. She was also reportedly deeply involved in the extravagant corruption that characterised Mobutu's rule. In 1996, a government minister who feared that he was about to be sacked in an upcoming cabinet reshuffle flew to Mobutu's palace at Gbadolite to visit the president and his family, carrying a million US dollars in his briefcase as a gift for Bobi Ladawa. When the reshuffle came, he was promoted to deputy prime minister.

Mobutu was overthrown in May 1997 and fled into a luxurious exile, eased by the billions of US dollars that he had embezzled during his rule. Bobi Ladawa accompanied him to his eventual final place of exile in Morocco, and was at his bedside when he died from prostate cancer in September 1997. She remains in exile with her twin sister Kosia, and reportedly divides her time between Rabat, where Mobutu is buried, Faro, Portugal, where the sisters own properties, and Brussels and Paris.

References

1945 births
Democratic Republic of the Congo women
Living people
People from Nord-Ubangi
First ladies of the Democratic Republic of the Congo
Democratic Republic of the Congo Roman Catholics
Mobutu Sese Seko
21st-century Democratic Republic of the Congo people